USS Patrol No. 6 (SP-54), often rendered as USS Patrol #6, was an armed motorboat that served in the United States Navy as a patrol vessel from 1917 to 1919.

Patrol No. 6 was built as the private motorboat Bonita in 1916 by George Lawley and Son at Neponset, Massachusetts. The U.S. Navy purchased Bonita from Herman Oelrichs of Newport, Rhode Island on 16 June 1917 and commissioned her for service in World War I as USS Patrol No. 6 (SP-54) on 29 June 1917.

Patrol No. 6 operated in the 2nd Naval District, headquartered at Newport, on patrol throughout the United States' participation in World War I. She was decommissioned postwar and stricken from the Naval Vessel Register on 7 November 1919. She was sold to George A. Crowley of New York City on 19 March 1921.

References

Department of the Navy: Naval Historical Center: Online Library of Selected Images: U.S. Navy Ships: USS Patrol # 6 (SP-54), 1917-1921
NavSource Online: Section Patrol Craft Photo Archive Patrol #6 (SP 54)

Patrol vessels of the United States Navy
World War I patrol vessels of the United States
Ships built in Boston
1916 ships